Braintree Rural District was a rural district in the county of Essex, England. It was created in 1894. In 1934 the parish of Bocking was removed from the Rural District and became part of the newly created Braintree and Bocking Urban District, thus dividing the Rural District into two detached parts. It was named after Braintree and administered from Bocking.  

Since 1 April 1974 it has formed part of the District of Braintree. 

At the time of its dissolution it consisted of the following 20 civil parishes.

Bardfield Saling
Black Notley
Bradwell
Coggeshall
Cressing
Fairstead
Faulkbourne
Feering
Finchingfield
Great Bardfield
Great Saling
Hatfield Peverel
Kelvedon
Panfield
Rayne
Shalford
Stisted
Terling
Wethersfield
White Notley

Political history of Essex
Districts of England created by the Local Government Act 1894
Districts of England abolished by the Local Government Act 1972
Rural districts of England